Gunnessia is a species of plants in the family Apocynaceae first described as a genus in 1990. It contains only one known species, Gunnessia pepo endemic to the State of Queensland in Australia.

Altitudinal range from near sea level to 100 m. Grows in vine thicket, monsoon forest and rain forest.

References

Asclepiadoideae
Flora of Queensland
Monotypic Apocynaceae genera
Taxa named by Paul Irwin Forster